Let's Get Real, Real Gone for a Change is the debut album from punk jazz band Gone. It was released by SST in 1986.

Continuing where mid-1980s era Black Flag left off, Greg Ginn's band combines 1970s riff-rock with jazz tempos and a punkish-verve.

Track listing
All songs written and arranged by Gone.
"Insidious Distraction" 3:59
"Get Gone" 3:57
"Peter Gone" 2:27
"Rosanne" 3:35
"Climbing Rat's Wall" 2:11
"Watch the Tractor" 2:10
"Last Days of Being Stepped On" 2:34
"CH. 69" 3:23
"Lawndale Rock City" 3:25
"Fifth Course Suite: Hypercharge/The Wait" 8:03

Personnel
Gone
Greg Ginn - guitars
Andrew Weiss - bass, keyboards, sampling
Sim Cain - drums

References

1986 debut albums
SST Records albums
Gone (band) albums